Katanning Senior High School is a comprehensive public co-educational high day school, located in Katanning, a regional centre  south east of Perth, Western Australia.

History
The school was established in 1961 and by 2012 had an enrolment of 373 students between Year 8 and Year 12, approximately 15% of whom were Indigenous Australians.

The school initially opened as a junior high school in 1950 and continued to operate as one until becoming a high school in 1961.

Beverley Stanes was the principal of the school from 2004 to 2010, before departing to take the principal position at Merredin College. Nicki Polding was the principal of the school from 2011 to 2017. Carolyn Cook served as principal from 2017 to 2021. In 2022, Innocent Chikwama was appointed as principal.

Enrolments at the school have been reasonably steady with 373 students at the school in 2017, 385 in 2018, 378 in 2009 and 359 in 2020.

Katanning Residential College
Katanning Residential College was located adjacent to the school and offered boarding facilities to many High School students from remote areas. The College was formerly known as St Andrew's Hostel. The Residential College closed in 2009.

See also

List of schools in rural Western Australia

References

External links
 https://katanningshs.wa.edu.au/

Public high schools in Western Australia
Educational institutions established in 1950
1950 establishments in Australia
Katanning, Western Australia